A mantlet was a portable wall or shelter used for stopping projectiles in medieval warfare. It could be mounted on a wheeled carriage, and protected one or several soldiers.

In the First World War a mantlet type of device was used by the French to attack barbed wire entanglements.

Gun mantlet 

In military use from pre-WW2 onward, a mantlet is the thick, protective steel frontal shield, usually able to elevate and depress, which houses the main gun on an armoured tank, examples being Tiger Tank, Sherman Tank and Churchill Tank.

Gallery

See also
Chemise (wall)
Pavise
Gabion
Testudo formation

References

Further reading
Farrow's military encyclopedia: a dictionary of military knowledge By Edward Samuel Farrow. Page 259

Siege equipment